DOC, Doc, doc or DoC may refer to:

Film, television, and radio 
 Doc (film), a 1971 American Western film
 Doc (1975 TV series), a 1975–1976 American sitcom
 Doc (2001 TV series), a 2001–2004 American medical drama
 Doc – Nelle tue mani, a 2020–2022 Italian medical drama TV series
 "D.O.C." (Lost), a 2007 television episode
 Doc on One, an Irish radio documentary series

Music
 The D.O.C. (born 1968), American rapper
D.O.C., a 2019 album by Zucchero

People  
 Doc (nickname)
 Doc, an abbreviation of doctor
 Doc Gallows (born 1983), ring name of American professional wrestler Drew Hankinson

Places 
 Dóc, a village in Csongrád County, Hungary
 Dóc, the Hungarian name for Dolaţ village, Livezile, Timiș, Romania
 DOC, the National Rail station code for Dockyard railway station, Plymouth, England

Characters 
 Doc (Buffyverse), in Buffy the Vampire Slayer
 Doc (Chrono Cross)
 Doc (G.I. Joe), two characters in the G.I. Joe universe
 Doc (cartoon character), an animated cat introduced by Walter Lantz Studios in 1959
 Doc Adams (Gunsmoke), in the TV series Gunsmoke
 Doc Boy, from the Garfield series
 Emmett Brown, a scientist from Back to the Future
 Doc Daneeka, in the novel Catch-22
 Doc Hudson, in the film Cars
 Doc Louis, in the video game series Punch-Out!!
 Doc McStuffins, a Disney Junior title character
 Monte 'Doc' Parker, in the series Third Watch
 Doc Saturday, in the series The Secret Saturdays
 Doc Savage, a pulp fiction hero
 Doc, in the series Fraggle Rock
 Doc, in the 2013 animated film Escape from Planet Earth
 Doc, a short-eared, long-legged dog, in the cartoons of Elmer Andrews Bushnell
 Medical Officer Frank "Doc" DuFresne, in the web series Red vs. Blue
 Doc, a dwarf in the animated 1937 Disney film Snow White and the Seven Dwarfs

Government departments 
 United States Department of Commerce, the Cabinet department of the United States government concerned with promoting economic growth
 Department of Conservation (New Zealand), the public service department of New Zealand charged with the conservation of New Zealand's natural and historical heritage
 Department of Corrections (various), a governmental agency responsible for overseeing the incarceration of persons convicted of crimes within a particular jurisdiction

Computing 
 Doc (computing), a word processing file format, typically used by Microsoft Word
 DiskOnChip, a type of flash memory device
 Dave's own version of Citadel, a bulletin board software variant
 Department of Computing, Imperial College London, the computer science department at Imperial College London

Food and wine appellations 
 Denominazione di origine controllata, an Italian level of wine classification
 Denominação de Origem Controlada, a Portuguese level of classification
 Denominación de Origen Calificada, a Spanish level of classification

Medical abbreviations
 DOC, 11-Deoxycorticosterone, a steroid hormone
 DOC, 2,5-Dimethoxy-4-chloroamphetamine, a psychedelic amphetamine
 DOC, Deoxycholic acid, a bile acid

Other uses 
 Dartmouth Outing Club, the oldest and largest collegiate outing club in the United States
 Documentary Organization of Canada, known as DOC, a non-profit organization supporting documentary filmmakers in Canada
 Doc Films, a University of Chicago film society
 Day-old cockerel, a term in falconry
 Diesel Oxidation Catalyst, a diesel retrofit system for automobiles
 Dissolved organic carbon, a molecule classification
 Doc (aircraft), the airworthy Boeing B-29 Superfortress bearing military serial number 44-69972 
 Doc (mascot), the Towson University mascot
 ISO 639-3 code for the North Dong, language or dialect of China
 D.O.C., a 2019 album by Zucchero Fornaciari

See also 
 Doc+, a Russian medical company
 Dock (disambiguation)
 Docs (disambiguation)
 Doctor (disambiguation)
 Documentation, a set of documents provided on paper, or online, or on digital or analog media, such as audio tape or CDs